Nathan, Nate or Nathaniel James may refer to:

USS Nathan James, a fictional ship in The Last Ship
Nate James (born 1979), singer-songwriter
Nate James (American football) (born 1945), American football player
Nate James (basketball) (born 1977), American basketball player and coach

See also